Saint Hypatius of Bithynia (died ca. 450) was a monk and hermit of the fifth century.  A Phrygian, he became a hermit at the age of nineteen in Thrace.  He then traveled to Constantinople and then Chalcedon with another hermit named Jason.  He became abbot of a hermitage at Chalcedon.

He was an opponent of Nestorianism and sheltered Saint Alexander Akimetes and others whose safety was threatened by the Nestorians.

He is credited with halting a revival of the Olympic games because of their pagan origins.

His feast day is June 17 in the Eastern Orthodox and Byzantine Catholic Churches.

References

Catholic Online: Hypatius

See also

Desert Fathers
Poustinia

Byzantine hermits
450 deaths
5th-century Christian saints
Year of birth unknown
People from Bithynia